The 2005 FIA GT RAC Tourist Trophy was the third race for the 2005 FIA GT Championship season, and was the first time the RAC Tourist Trophy was held as a round of the FIA GT Championship.  It took place on 15 May 2005 at the Silverstone Circuit.

The Aston Martin DBR9 made its debut in the FIA GT Championship here. However, since both cars were entered by the factory, they were ineligible for scoring points.

Official results

Class winners in bold.  Cars failing to complete 70% of winner's distance marked as Not Classified (NC).

† – These entries are considered factory teams and thus do not score points for the championship.

Statistics
 Pole Position – #28 Aston Martin Racing – 1:15.792
 Fastest Lap – #28 Aston Martin Racing – 1:17.490
 Average Speed – 161.28 km/h

External links
 Official Results
 Race results

T
FIA GT
RAC Tourist Trophy